Mitsuomi (written: 光臣) is a masculine Japanese given name. Notable people with the name include:

, Japanese imperial army general
, Japanese actor

Fictional characters
, character in the manga series Tenjho Tenge

Japanese masculine given names